Mikałaj Prakopavič Michałap was a Soviet ceramic artist and director of the National Art Museum of Belarus from 1939 to 1941.

Early life 
Mikałaj Miсhałap came from the family of a railwayman father and housemaid mother. He graduated from Baron Stieglitz Central school for Technical Draftsmanship (current Saint Petersburg Art and Industry Academy). Michałap was the first Belarusian ceramic artist.

Career 
Mikałaj was teaching in Vitebsk Art School and running a department of pottery and ceramic there from 1925 to 1930. He was close with Belarusian classic Janka Kupała; he painted his portrait and created first decoration for one of Kupała's plays.

References

1886 births
1979 deaths
20th-century Belarusian artists